Bazinul Olimpic Ioan Alexandrescu is a water polo centre in Oradea, Romania and is the home ground of CSM Digi Oradea. The centre holds 1,035 people.

References

Sport in Oradea
Indoor arenas in Romania
Buildings and structures in Bihor County